Momota (written:  or ) is a Japanese surname. Notable people with the surname include:

, Japanese idol, actress, and singer
, Japanese badminton player
, Korean-Japanese wrestler
, Japanese professional wrestler and executive
, Japanese professional wrestler and former ring announcer

Japanese-language surnames